The Helix Nebula (also known as NGC 7293 or Caldwell 63) is a planetary nebula (PN) located in the constellation Aquarius. Discovered by Karl Ludwig Harding, probably before 1824, this object is one of the closest of all the bright planetary nebulae to Earth. The distance, measured by the Gaia mission, is 655±13 light-years. It is similar in appearance to the Cat's Eye Nebula and the Ring Nebula, whose size, age, and physical characteristics are similar to the Dumbbell Nebula, varying only in its relative proximity and the appearance from the equatorial viewing angle.  The Helix Nebula has sometimes been referred to as the "Eye of God" in pop culture, as well as the "Eye of Sauron".

General information
The Helix Nebula is an example of a planetary nebula, formed by an intermediate to low-mass star, which sheds its outer layers near the end of its evolution. Gases from the star in the surrounding space appear, from our vantage point, as if we are looking down a helix structure. The remnant central stellar core, known as the central star (CS) of the planetary nebula, is destined to become a white dwarf star. The observed glow of the central star is so energetic that it causes the previously expelled gases to brightly fluoresce.

The nebula is in the constellation of Aquarius, and lies about 650 light-years away, spanning about 0.8 parsecs (2.5 light-years). Its age is estimated to be  years, based on the ratio of its size to its measured expansion rate of 31 km·s−1.

Structure

The Helix Nebula is thought to be shaped like a prolate spheroid with strong density concentrations toward the filled disk along the equatorial plane, whose major axis is inclined about 21° to 37° from our vantage point. The size of the inner disk is 8×19 arcmin in diameter (0.52 pc); the outer torus is 12×22 arcmin in diameter (0.77 pc); and the outer-most ring is about 25 arcmin in diameter (1.76 pc). The outer-most ring appears flattened on one side due to it colliding with the ambient interstellar medium.

Expansion of the whole planetary nebula structure is estimated to have occurred in the last 6,560 years, and 12,100 years for the inner disk. Spectroscopically, the outer ring's expansion rate is 40 km/s, and about 32 km/s for the inner disk.

Knots

The Helix Nebula was the first planetary nebula discovered to contain cometary knots. Its main ring contains knots of nebulosity, which have now been detected in several nearby planetary nebulae, especially those with a molecular envelope like the Ring nebula and the Dumbbell Nebula.  These knots are radially symmetric (from the CS) and are described as "cometary", each centered on a core of neutral molecular gas and containing bright  local photoionization fronts or cusps towards the central star and tails away from it. All tails extend away from the Planetary Nebula Nucleus (PNN) in a radial direction. Excluding the tails, each knot is approximately the size of the Solar System, while each of the cusp knots are optically thick due to Lyc photons from the CS. There are about 40,000 cometary knots in the Helix Nebula.

The knots are probably the result of Rayleigh-Taylor instability.  The low density, high expansion velocity ionized inner nebula is accelerating the denser, slowly expanding, largely neutral material which had been shed earlier when the star was on the Asymptotic Giant Branch.

The excitation temperature varies across the Helix nebula. The rotational-vibrational temperature ranges from 1800 K in a cometary knot located in the inner region of the nebula are about 2.5'(arcmin) from the CS, and is calculated at about 900 K in the outer region at the distance of 5.6'.

Videos

See also
 New General Catalogue (NGC)

References

External links

 
 
 NASA/JPL-Caltech - The Helix Nebula (NGC 7293)
 SEDS - The Helix Nebula (NGC 7293)
 NightSkyInfo – The Helix Nebula (NGC 7293)
 Snopes - Helix Eye of God - Urban Legend
 
 Helix Nebula (NGC 7293) at Constellation Guide

Aquarius (constellation)
Articles containing video clips
063b
NGC objects
Planetary nebulae